The 4th Alpini Paratroopers Regiment is a Ranger-type special forces regiment of the Italian Army, specializing in mountain combat. The regiment is one of three regiments of the Army Special Forces Command. The regiment is a unit of the Italian Army's mountain infantry speciality, the Alpini, which distinguished itself in combat during World War I and World War II. The 4th Alpini Paratroopers Regiment is one of the most decorated units of the Italian Army, although its two Gold Medals of Military Valour were awarded to the regiment's currently inactive Alpini Battalion "Aosta", respectively the currently active Skiers Battalion "Monte Cervino".

History

Formation 
The 4th Alpini Regiment was formed on 1 November 1882. It consisted of the three battalions: "Val Pellice", "Val Chisone" and "Val Brenta", named after the valleys from which the battalion's soldiers were recruited. In 1886 the battalions were renamed, taking their new names from the location of their logistic depot: "Pinerolo", "Aosta" and "Ivrea". In 1888 the "Pinerolo" was transferred to the 3rd Alpini Regiment and in exchange the "Susa 2°" battalion was transferred from the 3rd to the 4th Alpini. In 1908 the "Susa" returned to the 3rd Alpini and in the city of Intra the "Pallanza" battalion was raised as substitute, with existing companies from other Alpini battalions. In 1909 the "Pallanza" was renamed "Intra". Thus the regiment's structure in 1910 was:

  Alpini Battalion "Ivrea", with the companies: 38, 39, 40
  Alpini Battalion "Aosta", with the companies: 41, 42, 43
  Alpini Battalion "Intra", with the companies: 7 (former "Aosta" company), 24 (former "Pinerolo" company), 37 (former "Ivrea" company)

World War I 

During World War I the regiment consisted of ten battalions and saw heavy fighting in the Alps regions of the Italian front against Austro-Hungarian and German forces. During the war the regiment consisted of the following battalions (pre-war battalions in bold, followed by their first and second line reserve battalions):

  Ivrea, Val d'Orco, Monte Levanna, Pallanza
  Aosta, Val Baltea, Monte Cervino
  Intra, Val Toce, Monte Rosa

The Alpini Battalion "Aosta" distinguished itself in 1917 during heavy combat on Monte Vodice and in 1918 on Monte Solarolo, for which the battalion was awarded  Gold Medal of Military Valour. The regiment's battalions were also awarded five Silver Medals of Military Valour during the war, four of which were shared between the Intra and Val D'Orco battalions, the Aosta and Val Toce battalions, the Monte Levanna and Aosta battalions, and the Monte Levanna and Val Toce battalions. During the war a total of 31,000 men served in the 4th Alpini Regiment, of which 189 officers and 4,704 soldiers were killed, and 455 officers and 10,923 soldiers were wounded.

Interwar years 
On 10 September 1935, the 1st Alpine Division "Taurinense" was formed, which consisted of the 3rd Alpini Regiment, 4th Alpini Regiment, and 1st Mountain Artillery Regiment. The division participated in 1936 in the Italian invasion of Abyssinia.

World War II 

In 1940 the regiment, as part of the Taurinense division, fought in the Italian attack on Greece. After the German invasion of Yugoslavia the Taurinense performed garrison and anti-partisan duties in Montenegro. After the announcement of the Armistice of Cassibile on 8 September 1943 most of the division was captured by German forces near Kotor, while the Alpini Battalion "Ivrea" and Alpine Artillery Group "Aosta" joined the Yugoslav Partisans and formed the Partisan Division "Garibaldi".

Cold War 

After World War II the 4th Alpini Regiment was reformed on 15 April 1946 with the battalions "Aosta", "Saluzzo" and "Susa". In 1953 the "Mondovì" battalion was reactivated as fourth battalion of the regiment. The 4th Alpini Regiment was the infantry component of Alpine Brigade "Taurinense". on 26 October 1962 the "Mondovì" was transferred to the region of Friuli-Venezia Giulia to augment the Alpine Brigade "Julia" and in 1963 the "Aosta" battalion was transferred to the Alpine Military School in Aosta. Four years later it was again subordinated to 4th Alpini Regiment. 

In the early stages of the Cold War the 4th Alpini Regiment consisted of the following units:

  4th Alpini Regiment, in Turin
  Command and Services Company, in Turin
  Alpini Battalion "Mondovì", in Paluzza (raised in 1953, transferred to the Alpine Brigade "Julia" on 26 October 1962)
  9th Alpini Company
  10th Alpini Company
  11th Alpini Company
  103rd Mortar Company
  Alpini Battalion "Aosta", in Aosta (assigned to the Alpine Military School between 1963–1967)
  41st Alpini Company
  42nd Alpini Company
  43rd Alpini Company
  143rd Mortar Company
  Alpini Battalion "Saluzzo", in Borgo San Dalmazzo
  21st Alpini Company
  22nd Alpini Company
  23rd Alpini Company
  106th Mortar Company
  Alpini Battalion "Susa", in Pinerolo
  34th Alpini Company
  35th Alpini Company
  36th Alpini Company
  133rd Mortar Company

During the 1975 army reform the army disbanded the regimental level and newly independent battalions were given for the first time their own flags. On 10 October 1975 the 4th Alpini Regiment was disbanded and on the same day the regiment's Alpini Battalion "Aosta" in Aosta was assigned the flag and traditions of the 4th Alpini Regiment. The "Aosta" was assigned to the Alpine Military School and would have joined the Taurinense only in case of war. On 11 September 1989 the Alpini Battalion "Aosta" was reorganized as Tactical Logistic Support Battalion "Aosta", which supported the Alpine Military School.

Current structure 

On 1 July 1998 Logistical and Tactical Support Battalion "Aosta" was merged with the Complement Officer Cadets Battalion and redesignated as Training Battalion "Aosta". In 2001 the battalion was reduced Training Grouping "Aosta" and therefore transferred the flag of the 4th Alpini Regiment to the Shrine of the Flags in the Vittoriano in Rome.. 

On 25 September 2004, the 4th Alpini Regiment was reformed as 4th Alpini Paratroopers Regiment in the city of Bolzano with the existing Alpini Paratroopers Battalion "Monte Cervino" as its only battalion. Today the 4th Alpini Paratroopers Regiment is one of three special forces regiments of the Italian Army. The Alpini Paratroopers have recently served in Iraq and one of the regiment's companies was continuously rotated to Afghanistan. In January 2011 the regiment moved to its new base in Montorio Veronese and in 2013 joined the newly formed Army Special Forces Command (COMFOSE).

As of 2022 the regiment's structure is as follows:

  4th Alpini Paratroopers Regiment, in Montorio Veronese
  Regimental Command
  Staff and Personnel Office
  Operations, Training and Information Office
  Logistic and Administrative Office
  Command and Logistic Support Company "Aquile"
  Alpini Paratroopers Battalion "Monte Cervino"
  1st Ranger Company
  2nd Ranger Company
  3rd Ranger Company
  80th Maneuver Support Company
  Operational Support Battalion "Intra"
  Operational Support Company
  Training Company

The Command and Logistic Support Company fields the following platoons: C3 Platoon, Transport and Materiel Platoon, Medical Platoon, and Commissariat Platoon. The Operational Support Company consists of a C4 Platoon and a Mobility Support Platoon. Each Ranger company fields three platoons of 36 men. The Maneuver Support Company fields an Anti-tank Platoon with eight Spike MR anti-tank guided missiles launchers, a Heavy Mortar Platoon with three F1 120mm mortars and a Medium Mortar Platoon with three Expal 81mm mortars. The maneuver support company is equipped with a total of six F1 120mm mortars and six Expal 81mm mortars, allowing the mortar platoons to switch between calibres as needed.

Military honors 
The 4th Alpini Regiment is one of the most decorated regiments of the Italian Army. During its existence the regiment and its battalions were awarded:

 1x Knight Cross of the Military Order of Italy for service in World War I
 1x Knight Cross of the Military Order of Italy for service in the War on Terror 2002-2018
 2x Gold Medals of Military Valor:
 1x for the conquest of Monte Solarolo by the "Aosta" battalion, 25–27 October 1918
 1x for the campaign in the Soviet Union by the Skiers Battalion "Monte Cervino"
 9x Silver Medals of Military Valor:
 1x for the conquest of the saddle between Monte Nero and Monte Rosso by the "Intra" and "Val d'Orco" battalions, 19–21 July 1915
 1x for the conquest and defense of the Austrian positions on Alpe di Cosmagnon by the "Aosta" and "Val Toce" battalions, 10 September and 9–12 October 1916
 1x for the conquest of Monte Vodice by the "Aosta" and "Levanna" battalions, 18–21 May 1917
 1x for the service of the "Monte Cervino" battalion during the battles of Monte Vodice, 26–30 May 1917, Monte Melette, 17–26 November 1917 and Monte Fior, 4 December 1917
 1x for operations of the "Levanna" and "Val Toce" battalions on Monte Solarolo, 24–28 October 1918
 1x for the defense of the Mecan Pass by the "Intra" battalion during the Second Italo-Abyssinian War, 31 March 1936
 1x for the service of the "Monte Cervino" battalion during the Greco-Italian War, 10 January to 23 April 1941
 1x for the refusal of the "Ivrea" battalion to surrender to German Forces after the armistice of September 1943 and the subsequent service with Yugoslav partisans in Montenegro, September to November 1943
 1x for the service of the "Piemonte" battalion with the Italian Co-Belligerent Army during the Italian liberation campaign, 18 March 1944 to 8 May 1945
 1x "Bronze Medal of Military Valor" for defensive operations of the "Intra" battalion during the Greco-Italian War, 24–26 January 1941
 1x "Silver Medal of Civil Valor" for service after the 1957 Piedmont floods
 1x "Silver Medal of Civil Merit" for service after the 1908 Messina earthquake

See also 
 Mino - a TV series about the regiment's "Aosta" battalion in World War I

External links 
 Official Homepage
 4th Alpini Paratroopers Regiment on vecio.it

Sources 
 Franco dell'Uomo, Rodolfo Puletti: "L'Esercito Italiano verso il 2000 - Volume Primo - Tomo I", Rome 1998, Stato Maggiore dell'Esercito - Ufficio Storico, page: 466

References 

Alpini regiments of Italy
Regiments of Italy in World War I
Regiments of Italy in World War II
Special forces of Italy
Airborne units and formations of Italy
Military units and formations established in 1882
Military units and formations disestablished in 1943
Military units and formations established in 1946
Military units and formations disestablished in 1975
Military units and formations established in 2004
Ranger units and formations